The Tonquin was a 496-ton merchant vessel built in 1845 by Waterman & Ewell in Medford, Massachusetts, and owned by George R. Minot and Nathaniel Hooper of Boston. She sailed from New York to San Francisco. On November 19, 1849, she was wrecked at the entrance to San Francisco, on Whaleman's Reef.

References

Age of Sail merchant ships of the United States
Ships built in Medford, Massachusetts
1845 ships
Shipwrecks of the California coast